Malyala Rajaiah (25 February 1944 - 15 October 2018) was an Indian politician and the Member of parliament who represented Siddipet parliamentary constituency from 1998 to 2004, and served as the member of legislative assembly for Andhol constituency in 1985 which only ended in 1998 until he contested 12th Lok Sabha and 13th General elections of India.

Life and background 
Malyala Rajaiah was born on 25 February 1944 in Vedira village of Karimnagar, Telangana. He did Bachelor of Arts in Hyderabad from a college and Bachelor of Laws at Osmania University, Hyderabad. started practising as an Advocate in Secunderabad city civil court.

Career
Before he joined the politics, he was serving as a Judge in state of Andhra Pradesh from 1979 to 1985. He practiced as an Advocate from 1975 to 1979.Before that he also worked in South central Railways for 8 years. In 1985 he contested assembly election and assumed office as a Member of the Legislative Assembly He was appointed as a Chairman of Estimates legislative committee for 4 years till 1989 and as a Finance and Power minister from February to November in N.T.Rama Rao’s Cabinet. In 1994, he was re-elected for the assembly and was appointed as a chairman of SC legislative committee. He was appointed as a Member of TTD( Thirupati Thirumala Devasthanam) board in 1994. In 1996 when he was serving as MLA, he was credited with state Housing ministry till 1998. It was 1998 when he contested 12th General elections of India from Siddipet constituency and served as a member of parliament till 1999. He was then re-elected in 13th Lok Sabha elections with highest majority in the State and remained in office till 2004. During this period he was the member of parliamentary committee on Defence, Industries and parliamentary committee on SC’s and ST’s.

Personal life
Malyala Rajaiah was born to Malyala Mallaiah and Durgamma on 25 February 1944 and was married at a very young age  to "M. Anasuya Devi" on 23 May 1964. He had two sons Srinivas and Ravinder and two daughters Sharada and Saroja.

References

1944 births
2018 deaths
India MPs 1998–1999
India MPs 2004–2009
Malayali people
Andhra Pradesh MLAs 1994–1999
Andhra Pradesh MLAs 1985–1989
Indian politicians